

Names

After Greek antiquity

Teams in Greece
Aias Salamina F.C. after Ajax of Salamis
Aiolikos F.C. after Aeolians
Apollon Kalamarias F.C., Apollon Patras, Apollon Smyrni F.C. after Apollo
Aris Thessaloniki F.C. after Ares
Kolossos Rodou BC after Colossus of Rhodes
Diagoras F.C. after Olympic boxer Diagoras of Rhodes
Ergotelis F.C. after Olympic runner Ergoteles of Himera
Ionikos F.C. after Ionia
G.S. Iraklis Thessaloniki and Iraklis Patras after Heracles
Irodotos F.C. team in  Nea Alikarnassos, Crete after Herodotus of Halicarnassus
Odysseas Anagennisi F.C. after Odysseus
Olympiakos meaning Olympic in Greek,(see Ancient Olympic Games). Name of various teams including Olympiada Patras and Olympia Larissa BC.
Panionios after Panionium
Vyzas F.C. after Byzas
Thrasyvoulos F.C. after Thrasybulus

Teams in Cyprus
Achilleas after Achilles
Apollon Limassol
Aris Limassol F.C. after Ares
Chalkanoras Idaliou after Chalcanor, Achaean king and founder of Idalion city
Ermis Aradippou after Hermes
Olympiakos Nicosia
Onisilos Sotira after Onesilus, ancient Cypriot leader in Ionian Revolt
Proteas EKA AEL after Proteus, mythology.

Teams in The Netherlands
AFC Ajax after  Ajax (See also Ajax (disambiguation) for other teams)
Heracles Almelo after the Greek hero Heracles
Sparta Rotterdam after the Greek city-state Sparta
Xerxes Rotterdam after the Persian emperor Xerxes I
Achilles '29 after the Greek hero Achilles
SBV Excelsior after the Latin word excelsior
Fortuna Sittard after the Roman goddess Fortuna (Tyche in Greek mythology)

Teams in the Czech Republic
Various sports clubs in Prague, the Czech Republic, have been named after Greek city-state Sparta:
AC Sparta Prague – football club
AC Sparta Prague – floorball club
BC Sparta Prague – basketball club
HC Sparta Prague – ice hockey club
OK Sparta Prague – foot orienteering club
RC Sparta Prague – rugby club
SK Sparta Krč – football club
TK Sparta Prague – dancesport club

Italy
Atalanta B.C. Italian football club, after Greek heroine Atalanta.
Hellas Verona F.C.In 1903 the club was named Hellas (the ancient Greek word for Greece), at the request of a professor of Classics.

England
Blackburn Olympic F.C., English football team founded in 1878 and dissolved in 1889
Blyth Spartans A.F.C., English football team founded in 1899
Huddersfield Atalanta Ladies F.C., English football team named after the heroine Atalanta
Hull Ionians, English rugby team after Ionians
Manchester Spartans, American football club founded in 1983

English association football leagues
Aetolian League defunct  (after Aetolian League)
Athenian League defunct
Corinthian League defunct
Delphian League defunct
Isthmian League  after Isthmian Games
Spartan League defunct

Others
Atlas Lacrosse Club after Atlas (mythology) - Lacrosse team in the Premier Lacrosse League
Akilles Porvoo after Achilles - Finnish sports club from Porvoo.
A.S.D. Akragas Calcio. In 1952, by renaming to Akragas, rather than using the Italianized version of the name (Agrigento), the club paid homage to the city's Magna Graecia roots.
F.C. Atlas and Club Atlético Atlas soccer teams in Latin America, after Atlas (mythology)
KK Helios Domžale and FC Helios Kharkiv after Helios the Sun-god.
Hércules CF (Spanish team) and Hércules (Salvadoran team) after Hercules and Heracles.
Hermes Club (the late 19th-century cyclist club of Chicago depicted Hermes on a gold disc the size of a quarter).
Hermes F.C., Scottish soccer team.
Hermes Ladies' Hockey Club, an Irish field hockey club.
Hermes Volley Oostende, Belgian volleyball team.
Michigan State Spartans, after Sparta
Various teams named after Olympia and Olympics, see Olympia, Olimpia, Olympique, Olympic, Olimpik and Olympians. Historical clubs, founded before 1910, are: Blackburn Olympic F.C. founded in 1878 and dissolved in 1889, Olympique de Marseille (1899) and Olympique Lyonnais (1950) and El-Olympi, Egyptian soccer team (1905).
Olimpo de Bahía Blanca (Argentine sports club)  after Olympus
Portsmouth Spartans, NFL team founded in 1928
Sparta Danish track and field club, Ħamrun Spartans F.C. in Malta, (soccer teams); Sparta, Finnish Handball club from Helsinki. Various teams named or nicknamed after Spartans, especially in USA, see List of sports teams named Spartans
Titans, various teams in USA, Canada, UK and Australia, see List of sports teams nicknamed Titans.
Toronto Argonauts, Canadian Football League team
Sports teams named Trojans in USA, Canada and UK.
Urania Genève Sport Swiss sports club founded in 1896 (after the muse Urania)
Salem Spartans, a cricket team of Tamil Nadu Premier League

After Roman antiquity
A.S.D. Albalonga (Italian soccer team) after Alba Longa
FC Dacia Chişinău and CS Dacia Mioveni (Moldovan and Romanian teams) after Dacia
Ottawa Senators (Canadian National Hockey League team) The club logo is the head of a Roman general, a member of the Senate of the Roman Republic
Romulus F.C. (English soccer team) after Romulus
Spartak (the Slavic name of Spartacus) was a popular name of various teams, originated during the Soviet and Socialist era, including Hungarian team Nyíregyháza Spartacus. Teams outside the Socialist world, named after Spartacus are: Spartak (Cape Verde), Greek Spartakos Ovrya F.C., English G.S.A. Sports F.C. and Swedish Spartacus Rugby Club.

Teams with Latin names
Albirex Niigata The Japanese soccer team name is made from combining the star Albireo  and the Latin word Rex meaning 'king'. In 1997, due to copyright issues, the team name was changed from Albireo Niigata to the current Albirex Niigata.
Juventus (iuventūs, youth) (Italian soccer team)
Toshiba Brave Lupus (lupus, wolf) (Japanese rugby team)

Symbols
Aquila, the Roman military sign of eagle is the emblem of the Italian soccer team S.S. Lazio. Lazio's colours of white and sky blue were also inspired by the national emblem of Greece, due to the fact that Lazio is a mixed sports club this was chosen in recognition of the fact that the Ancient Olympic Games and along with it the sporting tradition in Europe is linked to Greece.
Capitoline Wolf, emblem of the Italian soccer teams A.S. Roma and A.C. Siena.
Democritus the philosopher is depicted on the logo of the Greek soccer team Skoda Xanthi F.C.
Epirote League's name in the coins (Apeirotan, of Epirotes) is written on the logo of the Greek soccer team PAS Giannina F.C.
Hermes's winged sandal is depicted on the logo of Hermes Volley Oostende.
The Lighthouse of Alexandria is depicted on the emblem of the Alexandrian soccer team  El-Olympi, Egypt.
An athlete wearing a laurel wreath (kotinos) is the emblem of Olympiacos CFP. The mascot of the team is a lion, named Thryleon, evoking a historical name of Piraeus (Porto leone) after Piraeus Lion.
A legionary with Roman helmet  is depicted on the logos of Binghamton Senators and Ottawa Senators, ice hockey teams (North America)
A gladiator is depicted on the logos of Colchester Gladiators (American football) team and Atlanta Gladiators, ice hockey team.
Titormus the wrestler is the emblem of the Greek soccer team Panetolikos F.C.

See also
List of ethnic sports team and mascot names

References

External links
Greek Mythology in Modern Sports By: Derek Gerry

Names And Symbols Derived From Greek And Roman Antiquity
Team Names And Symbols Derived From Greek And Roman Antiquity
Sports Team Names
Sports Team Names
Classical mythology in popular culture
Team Names And Symbols Derived From Greek And Roman Antiquity
Sports team
Sports team
Sports team names and symbols
Sports team names and symbols